Michael Carbel Svendgaard (born 7 February 1995 in Addit) is a Danish former professional cyclist, who rode professionally between 2014 and 2020, for the , , ,  (two spells) and  teams.

Major results

2013
 1st  Road race, National Junior Road Championships
 1st Stage 2 Giro della Lunigiana
2014
 1st Dorpenomloop Rucphen
 2nd Road race, National Road Championships
 8th Eschborn-Frankfurt City Loop U23
2015
 3rd Overall ZLM Tour
1st Stage 2 (TTT)
 3rd Dwars door Drenthe
2016
 7th Fyen Rundt
 8th Ghent–Wevelgem U23
 9th Grand Prix Impanis-Van Petegem
2017
 1st  Road race, National Under-23 Road Championships
 1st GP Herning
 3rd  Road race, UCI Under-23 Road World Championships
 4th Trofej Umag
 10th Eschborn-Frankfurt City Loop U23
2018
 3rd Road race, National Road Championships
2019
 1st Stage 5 Flèche du Sud
 5th Himmerland Rundt

References

External links

1995 births
Living people
Danish male cyclists
People from Horsens
Sportspeople from the Central Denmark Region